The 2015 Malaysia FA Cup (2015 XOX Piala FA) was the 26th season of the Malaysia FA Cup, a knockout competition for Malaysia's state football association and clubs. Pahang were the defending champions after beating FELDA United 2–1 the previous season.

34 teams entered this year's competition. Four teams entered at the 1st stage with two clubs making the round of 32. The draw for the competition was made on 14 December 2014 with games starting in February 2015. Also starting in 2015, the finalists of the previous Piala FA have not been permitted with byes. 

Singapore's LionsXII won the Piala FA title for the first time after defeating two-time winners, Kelantan FA in the final with a score of 3–1. This marks the first time a foreign team has won the competition since its inception in 1990.

Matches

Bracket

Play-off round

Round of 32
The first round commenced on 27, 28 February & 2 March 2015.

Round of 16

The second round commenced on 17, 18 & 21 March 2015.

Quarter-finals

First leg

The first leg matches commenced on 7 & 8 April 2015.

Second leg

The second leg matches commenced on 21 & 22 April.

Semi-finals

First leg

The first leg matches commenced on 9 May 2015.

Second leg

The second leg matches commenced on 16 May 2015.

Final

References

 
2015 domestic association football cups
FA